Hong Jin-song (born 20 February 1994) is a North Korean footballer who currently plays as a defender.

Career statistics

International

References

External links
 

1994 births
Living people
North Korean footballers
North Korea international footballers
North Korea youth international footballers
Association football defenders